David von Grafenberg is a French novelist. He lives in Paris and works in the fashion industry. His first novel, Prostitué, appeared in 2007, followed by Surveillant and Madame de X.

References

French novelists
Year of birth missing (living people)
Living people
Writers from Paris
Place of birth missing (living people)
21st-century French male writers